

Result of municipal elections
Results of the 1928 municipal elections.

References

Local elections in Norway
1920s elections in Norway
Norway
Local